Brooklyn–Tompkins Avenues was a station on the demolished BMT Fulton Street Line. It was originally opened on May 30, 1888, and had 2 tracks and 2 side platforms. It was served by trains of the BMT Fulton Street Line. Eastbound trains stopped at Brooklyn Avenue, while westbound trains stopped at Tompkins Avenue. The station had connections to the Tompkins Avenue Line streetcars. The next stop to the east was Albany Avenue, which was replaced by Troy Avenue at some point.  The next stop to the west was Nostrand Avenue. In 1936, the Independent Subway System built an underground Fulton Street subway station at Kingston–Throop Avenues between here and the site of the former Albany–Sumner Avenues station. The el station became obsolete, and it closed on May 31, 1940.

References

Defunct BMT Fulton Street Line stations
Railway stations in the United States opened in 1888
Railway stations closed in 1940